George Francis Rayner Ellis, FRS, Hon. FRSSAf (born 11 August 1939), is the emeritus distinguished professor of complex systems in the Department of Mathematics and Applied Mathematics at the University of Cape Town in South Africa. He co-authored The Large Scale Structure of Space-Time with University of Cambridge physicist Stephen Hawking, published in 1973, and is considered one of the world's leading theorists in cosmology. From 1989 to 1992 he served as president of the International Society on General Relativity and Gravitation. He is a past president of the International Society for Science and Religion. He is an A-rated researcher with the NRF.

Ellis, an active Quaker, was a vocal opponent of apartheid during the National Party reign in the 1970s and 1980s, and it is during this period that Ellis's research focused on the more philosophical aspects of cosmology, for which he won the Templeton Prize in 2004. He was also awarded the Order of the Star of South Africa by Nelson Mandela, in 1999. On 18 May 2007, he was elected a fellow of the British Royal Society.

Life
Born in 1939 to George Rayner Ellis, a newspaper editor, and Gwendoline Hilda MacRobert Ellis in Johannesburg, George Francis Rayner Ellis attended the University of Cape Town, where he graduated with honours in 1960 with a Bachelor of Science degree in physics with distinction. He represented the university in fencing, rowing and flying.

While a student at Cambridge University, where he received a PhD in applied maths and theoretical physics in 1964, he was on college rowing teams.

At Cambridge, Ellis served as a research fellow from 1965 to 1967, was assistant lecturer in the Department of Applied Mathematics and Theoretical Physics until 1970, and was then appointed university lecturer, serving until 1974.

Ellis became a visiting professor at the Enrico Fermi Institute at the University of Chicago in 1970, a lecturer at the Cargese Summer School in Corsica in 1971 and the Erice Summer School in Sicily in 1972, and a visiting H3 professor at the University of Hamburg, also in 1972.

The following year, Ellis co-wrote The Large Scale Structure of Space-Time with Stephen Hawking, debuting at a strategic moment in the development of General Relativity Theory.

In the following year, Ellis returned to South Africa to accept an appointment as professor of applied mathematics at the University of Cape Town, a position he held until his retirement in 2005.

In 2005 Ellis appeared as a guest speaker at the Nobel Conference in St. Peter, Minnesota.

Work
George Ellis has worked for many decades on anisotropic cosmologies (Bianchi models) and inhomogeneous universes, and on the philosophy of cosmology. He is currently writing on the emergence of complexity, and the way this is enabled by top-down causation in the hierarchy of complexity. Recently Ellis has also collaborated with Teppo Felin, Denis Noble, and Jan Koenderink on a set of articles published in the journal Genome Biology. In terms of philosophy of science, Ellis is a Platonist.

Publications

Books

Papers
Ellis has over 500 published articles; including 17 in Nature. Notable papers include:

Honours
In 2019 Rhodes University in Grahamstown announced it would award Ellis an honorary doctorate in laws (LLD, hc)

See also 
List of science and religion scholars

Notes and references

External links

 Partial list of Ellis' published papers
 George Ellis's web page
 Professor George Ellis: a man of many parts, Cape Argus, 18 March 2004
 George Ellis's scientific work as listed at SPIRES
  on Speaking of Faith with Krista Tippett (transcript)
 George Ellis extended interview with transcript for the 'Why Are We Here?' documentary series.

1939 births
Living people
Alumni of Michaelhouse
South African cosmologists
Fellows of the Royal Society
Members of the International Society for Science and Religion
Philosophers of cosmology
South African Christians
South African mathematicians
South African Quakers
Templeton Prize laureates
Academic staff of the University of Cape Town
University of Cape Town alumni
Writers about religion and science